The national flag of Estonia is a tricolour featuring three equal horizontal bands of blue (top), black, and white. The normal size is 105 × 165 cm. In Estonian it is colloquially called the "sinimustvalge" (literally "blue-black-white"), after the colours of the bands. The flag became associated with Estonian nationalism in the beginning of the 20th century and was used as the national flag (riigilipp) when the Estonian Declaration of Independence was issued on 24 February 1918. The flag was formally adopted on 21 November 1918. On 12 December 1918 the flag was raised for the first time as the national symbol atop of the Pikk Hermann tower in Tallinn.

The following is a list of flags of Estonia.

National flag

Standards

Head of state

Ministers

Military flags

Army

Navy

Air Force

Defence League

Government flags

Sporting Flags

Postal Flag

County flags

History

Municipal flags

Political flags

Ethnic groups flags

Historical flags

Proposed flags

See also 

 Flag of Estonia
 National symbols of Estonia

References 

Flags of Estonia
Lists and galleries of flags
Flags